In Greek mythology, Pasithea ( means "relaxation"), or Pasithee, was one of the Charites (Graces), and the personification of relaxation, meditation, hallucinations and all other altered states of consciousness.  The Charites are usually said to be the daughters of Zeus and Eurynome, but Pasithea's parentage is given (by the poet Nonnus) as Hera and Dionysus. She was married to Hypnos, the god of sleep.

Family
Her sisters are Aglaea ("Splendor"), Euphrosyne ("Mirth"), and Thalia ("Good Cheer"). In Roman mythology they were known as the Gratiae, the "Graces".

In book 14 of Homer's Iliad, Pasithea was one of the younger Charites. Hera promises her in marriage to Hypnos the god of sleep in exchange for him ensuring Zeus was temporarily removed from the action of the Trojan War. Robert Graves thinks that Homer also mentions the names of two Charites, Pasithea and Cale ("Beauty"), but the two Charites Homer used for Hesiod's Aglaea.

Although the Graces usually numbered three, according to the Spartans, Cleta, not Thalia, was the third, and other Graces are sometimes mentioned including Auxo, Hegemone, Peitho and Phaenna.

Notes

References

Hesiod, Theogony from The Homeric Hymns and Homerica with an English Translation by Hugh G. Evelyn-White, Cambridge, MA., Harvard University Press; London, William Heinemann Ltd. 1914. Online version at the Perseus Digital Library. Greek text available from the same website.
Homer, The Iliad with an English Translation by A.T. Murray, Ph.D. in two volumes. Cambridge, MA., Harvard University Press; London, William Heinemann, Ltd. 1924. . Online version at the Perseus Digital Library.
Homer, Homeri Opera in five volumes. Oxford, Oxford University Press. 1920. . Greek text available at the Perseus Digital Library.
Nonnus of Panopolis, Dionysiaca translated by William Henry Denham Rouse (1863-1950), from the Loeb Classical Library, Cambridge, MA, Harvard University Press, 1940.  Online version at the Topos Text Project.
Nonnus of Panopolis, Dionysiaca. 3 Vols. W.H.D. Rouse. Cambridge, MA., Harvard University Press; London, William Heinemann, Ltd. 1940–1942. Greek text available at the Perseus Digital Library.
Pausanias, Description of Greece with an English Translation by W.H.S. Jones, Litt.D., and H.A. Ormerod, M.A., in 4 Volumes. Cambridge, MA, Harvard University Press; London, William Heinemann Ltd. 1918. . Online version at the Perseus Digital Library
Pausanias, Graeciae Descriptio. 3 vols. Leipzig, Teubner. 1903.  Greek text available at the Perseus Digital Library.
Smith, William; Dictionary of Greek and Roman Biography and Mythology, London (1873). "Charis"

Greek goddesses
Greek sleep deities
Children of Hera
Children of Dionysus